Gazdar may refer to:
Gazdar, Iran, a village in Kerman Province, Iran
Gazdar, Razavi Khorasan, a village in Razavi Khorasan Province, Iran
Gerald Gazdar (b. 1950), linguist and computer scientist
Kaevan Gazdar (b. 1951), journalist
Muhammad Hashim Gazdar (1895 – 1966), Pakistani politician
Gazdarabad, neighbourhood in Karachi Sindh, Pakistan, named after Muhammad Hashim Gazdar
Mushtaq Gazdar, Pakistani cinematographer
Gazdar, another name of the Silawat community in India and Pakistan